John William Dennis (16 May 1865 – 4 August 1949) was a British politician. He was Mayor of Westminster in 1907–08, when he was described as Liberal Unionist. He was a Conservative Party Member of Parliament (MP) from 1918 to 1922 for the newly created constituency of Birmingham Deritend.

He was elected in the 1918 general election but only served for a single term being replaced by fellow Conservative Smedley Crooke at 1922 General Election.

References 

1865 births
1949 deaths
UK MPs 1918–1922
Members of the Parliament of the United Kingdom for English constituencies
Mayors of places in Greater London
Members of Westminster Metropolitan Borough Council